HMS Hotspur was 36-gun Fifth-rate frigate of the Royal Navy. Built by Parsons of Warsash and launched on 13 October 1810.

Career
On 25 August 1811, Hotspur and  captured Eseperance, of Havre de Grace, and Guillaume Chorede (or Guillaume Chere), from Cherbourg, both laden with timber. The captured vessels arrived in Portsmouth.

The East Indiamen had left England and were on their way to the East Indies.

In 1813 Hotspur was in Buenos Aires under the command of Captain Josceline Percy, the younger son of the Duke of Northumberland. This is where George Pegler, an English boy of about 14 joined the crew, having escaped from the crew of a merchant ship. Leaving, Buenos Aires, Horatio anchored for a while off the coast of Montevideo, near Isla de Flores, which the crew named Seal Island for the vast numbers of South American fur seals. Parties of 100 or more sailors from Horatio would land on the island every day to hunt the seals. After this, the frigate sailed for Rio de Janeiro and Portsmouth.

On 26 October 1813, Hotspur and  captured the 225-ton (bm) American letter of marque Chesapeake off Nantes. Captain Joseph Richardson had sailed Chesapeake from America to France and she left Nantes on 18 October 1813.

The French took off Little Catherines crew and abandoned her. On 28 November Hotspur picked her up at sea.

Fate
Hotspur was broken up in January 1821.

Notes, citations, and references
Notes

Citations

References

 
 Erickson, Paul A. (1986) Halifax's North End: an anthropologist looks at the city. (Lancelot Press)
 

1810 ships
Ships built in England
Fifth-rate frigates of the Royal Navy